Retina Display is a brand name used by Apple for its series of IPS LCD and OLED displays that have a higher pixel density than traditional Apple displays.  Apple has registered the term "Retina" as a trademark with regard to computers and mobile devices with the United States Patent and Trademark Office and Canadian Intellectual Property Office.  The applications were approved in 2012 and 2014 respectively. The Canadian application cited a 2010 application in Jamaica.

The Retina display debuted in 2010 with the iPhone 4 and the iPod Touch (4th Generation), and later the iPad (3rd generation) where each screen pixel of the iPhone 3GS, iPod touch (3rd generation), iPad 2 was replaced by four smaller pixels, and the user interface scaled up to fill in the extra pixels. Apple calls this mode HiDPI mode. In simpler words, it is one logical pixel corresponds to four physical pixels. The scale factor is tripled for devices with even higher pixel densities, such as the iPhone 6 Plus and iPhone X. The advantage of this equation is that the CPU "sees" a small portion of the data and calculates the relative positions of each element, and the GPU renders these elements with high quality assets. The goal of Retina displays is to make the text and images being displayed more crisp.

The Retina display has since expanded to most Apple product lines, such as Apple Watch, iPhone, iPod Touch, iPad, iPad Mini, iPad Air, iPad Pro, MacBook, MacBook Air, MacBook Pro, iMac, and Pro Display XDR, some of which have never had a comparable non-Retina display. Apple uses various marketing terms to differentiate between its LCD and OLED displays having various resolutions, contrast levels, color reproduction, or refresh rates.  It is known as Liquid Retina display for the iPhone XR, iPad Air 4th Generation, iPad Mini 6th Generation, iPad Pro 3rd Generation and later versions, and Retina 4.5K display for the iMac.

Apple's Retina displays are not an absolute standard for display sharpness, but vary depending on the size of the display on the device, and at what distance the user would typically be viewing the screen. Where on smaller devices with smaller displays users would view the screen at a closer distance to their eyes, the displays have more PPI (Pixels Per Inch), while on larger devices with larger displays where the user views the screen further away, the screen uses a lower PPI value. Later device versions have had additional improvements, whether an increase in the screen size (the iPhone 12 Pro Max), contrast ratio (the 12.9” iPad Pro 5th Generation, and iMac with Retina 4.5K display), and/or, more recently, PPI count (OLED iPhones); as a result, Apple uses the names “Retina HD display", "Retina 4K/5K display", “Retina 4.5K display", "Super Retina HD display", “Super Retina XDR display”, and "Liquid Retina display" for each successive version.

Rationale

When introducing the iPhone 4, Steve Jobs said the number of pixels needed for a Retina display is about 300 PPI for a device held 10 to 12 inches from the eye. One way of expressing this as a unit is pixels-per-degree (PPD) which takes into account both the screen resolution and the distance from which the device is viewed. Based on Jobs' predicted number of 300, the threshold for a Retina display starts at the PPD value of 57 PPD. 57 PPD means that a tall skinny triangle with a height equal to the viewing distance and a top angle of one degree will have a base on the device's screen that covers 57 pixels. Note that the PPD parameter is not an intrinsic parameter of the display itself, unlike absolute pixel resolution (e.g. 1920×1080 pixels) or relative pixel density (e.g. 401 PPI), but is dependent on the distance between the display and the eye of the person (or lens of the device) viewing the display; moving the eye closer to the display reduces the PPD, and moving away from it increases the PPD in proportion to the distance.
It can be calculated by the formula

In practice, thus far Apple has converted a device's display to Retina by doubling the number of pixels in each direction, quadrupling the total resolution. This increase creates a sharper interface at the same physical dimensions. The sole exception to this has been the iPhone 6 Plus, 6S Plus, 7 Plus, and 8 Plus, which renders its display at triple the number of pixels in each direction, before down-sampling to a 1080p resolution.

Models 

The displays are manufactured worldwide by different suppliers. Currently, the iPad's display comes from Samsung, while the MacBook Pro and iPod Touch displays are made by LG Display and Japan Display Inc. There was a shift of display technology from twisted nematic (TN) liquid-crystal displays (LCDs) to in-plane switching (IPS) LCDs starting with the iPhone 4 models in June 2010.

Apple markets the following devices as having a Retina display, Retina HD display, Liquid Retina display, Liquid Retina XDR display, Super Retina HD display, Super Retina XDR display or Retina 4K/5K/6K display:

Reception 

Reviews of Apple devices with Retina displays have generally been positive on technical grounds, with comments describing it as a considerable improvement on earlier screens and praising Apple for driving third-party application support for high-resolution displays more effectively than on Windows. While high-dpi displays such as IBM's T220 and T221 had been sold in the past, they had seen little take-up due to their cost of around $8400.

Reviewing the iPhone 4 in 2010, Joshua Topolsky commented:

"to our eyes, there has never been a more detailed, clear, or viewable screen on any mobile device. Not only are the colors and blacks deep and rich, but you simply cannot see pixels on the screen…webpages that would be line after line of pixelated content when zoomed out on a 3GS are completely readable on the iPhone 4, though the text is beyond microscopic."

Former Microsoft employee Bill Hill, an expert on font rendering, offered similar comments:

That much resolution is stunning. To see it on a mainstream device like the iPad—rather than a $13,000 exotic monitor—is truly amazing, and something I've been waiting more than a decade to see. It will set a bar for future resolution that every other manufacturer of devices and PCs will have to jump.

Writer John Gruber suggested that the arrival of Retina displays on computers would trigger a need to redesign interfaces and designs for the new displays:
The sort of rich, data-dense information design espoused by Edward Tufte can now not only be made on the computer screen but also enjoyed on one. Regarding font choices, you not only need not choose a font optimized for rendering on screen, but should not. Fonts optimized for screen rendering look cheap on the retina MacBook Pro—sometimes downright cheesy—in the same way they do when printed in a glossy magazine.

Detractors

Raymond Soneira, president of DisplayMate Technologies, has challenged Apple's claim. Astronomer and science blogger Phil Plait notes, however, that, "if you have [better than 20/20] eyesight, then at one foot away the iPhone 4S's pixels are resolved. The picture will look pixelated. If you have average eyesight [20/20 vision], the picture will look just fine... So in my opinion, what Jobs said was fine. Soneira, while technically correct, was being picky." The retinal neuroscientist Bryan Jones offers a similar analysis of more detail and comes to a similar conclusion: "I'd find Apple's claims stand up to what the human eye can perceive."

Apple fan website CultOfMac hosts an article by John Brownlee who incorrectly stated that the resolution the human eye can discern at 12 inches is 900 PPI, concluding "Apple's Retina Displays are only about 33% of the way there." On the topic of 20/20 vision, Brownlee misrepresented visual acuity in the population saying "most research suggests that normal vision is actually much better than 20/20" when in truth the majority have worse than 20/20 vision, and the  WHO considers average vision as 20/40. Brownlee also stated that people do not always view displays at a constant distance, and claimed a close-viewed display could no longer be classed as Retina. However, near visual acuity is usually poor due to presbyopia in nearly everyone over 40, such that decreasing reading distance can actually reduce perceivable resolution.

Competitors
The first smartphone following the iPhone 4 to ship with a display of a comparable pixel density was the Nokia E6, running Symbian Anna, with a resolution of 640 × 480 at a screen size of 62.5mm. This was an isolated case for the platform however, as all other Symbian-based devices had larger displays with lower resolutions. Some older Symbian smartphones, including the Nokia N80 and N90, featured a 2.1 inch display at 259 ppi, which was one of the sharpest at the time. The first Android smartphones with the same display - Meizu M9 was launched a few months later in beginning of 2011. In October of the same year Galaxy Nexus was announced, which had a display with a better resolution. By 2013 the 300+ ppimark was found on midrange phones such as the Moto G. From 2013 to 2014, many flagship devices such as the Samsung Galaxy S4 and HTC One (M8) had 1080p (FHD) screens around 5-inches for a 400+ PPI which surpassed the Retina density on the iPhone 5. The second major redesign of the iPhone, the iPhone 6, has a 1334 × 750 resolution on a 4.7-inch screen, while rivals such as the Samsung Galaxy S6 have a QHD display of 2560 × 1440 resolution, close to four times the number of pixels found in the iPhone 6, giving the S6 a 577 PPI that is almost twice that of the iPhone 6's 326 PPI. The Sony Xperia Z5 Premium launched in late 2015 had 806 PPI.

The larger iPhone 6 Plus features a "Retina HD display", which is a 5.5-inch 1080p screen with 401 PPI. Aside from resolution, all generations of iPhone Retina displays receive high ratings for other aspects such as brightness and color accuracy, compared to those of contemporary smartphones, while some Android devices such as the LG G3 have sacrificed screen quality and battery life for high resolution. Ars Technica suggested the "superfluousness of so many flagship phone features—the move from 720p to 1080p to 1440p and beyond...things are all nice to have, but you’d be hard-pressed to argue that any of them are essential". Furthermore, developers can better optimize content for iOS due to Apple's few screen sizes in contrast to Android's wide display format variations.

Many Windows-based Ultrabook models have offered 1080p (FHD) screens standard since 2012 and often QHD or QHD+ as optional upgrade displays.

See also 

 Resolution independence
 Pixel density
 HiDPI
 Pixelplus

References 

Apple Inc. displays
Computer display standards
IPhone
IPad
LCD brand names